Catherine Johnson (born 14 October 1957) is a British playwright, producing works for stage and television. She is best known for her book for the ABBA-inspired musical Mamma Mia! and screenplay for the musical's film adaptation. The film became the highest-grossing British picture of all time in the UK, and the biggest selling UK DVD of all time in January 2009. She also co-wrote the 2018 sequel, Mamma Mia! Here We Go Again.

Johnson grew up in Wickwar near Wotton-under-Edge and attended Katharine Lady Berkeley's School in Wotton. She was expelled from school at 16, married at 18 and divorced by the age of 24. She moved to Bristol and finding herself unemployed and with one child to support and another on the way she spotted a notice in the local paper for the Bristol Old Vic/HTV West playwriting competition. She wrote Rag Doll, using the pseudonym Maxwell Smart, a play about incest and child abuse, which won the competition and was staged by the Bristol Old Vic. Further plays for the Bush Theatre in London, Bristol Old Vic and Show of Strength followed along with work on television series including Casualty, Love Hurts and Byker Grove.

In 2007 Johnson instituted The Catherine Johnson Award for Best Play written by the five Pearson Playwrights' Scheme bursary winners from the previous year. Catherine won a bursary from the scheme in 1991. Catherine is a patron of the Wotton Electric Picture House in Wotton-under-Edge, Bristol's Myrtle Theatre Company and Arts and Community in Thornbury.

Credits

Stage
 Rag Doll (Bristol Old Vic Studio) (Winner BOV/HTV Playwriting Award) 1988
 Boys Mean Business (Bush Theatre) 1989
 Dead Sheep (Bush Theatre) (Co-winner Thames TV Best Play Award) 1991
 Too Much Too Young (Bristol Old Vic and London Bubble) 1992
 Where’s Willy? (Bristol Old Vic) 1994
 Renegades (Bristol Old Vic) 1995
 Shang-a-Lang (Bush Theatre & tour) 1998
 Mamma Mia! (LittleStar) 1999
 Little Baby Nothing (Bush Theatre) 2003
 Through The Wire (Shell Connections, RNT) 2005
 Through The Wire (new version) (Myrtle Theatre, Bristol 2006)
 City of One (Myrtle Theatre, Bristol 2008)
 Trade It? (Show of Strength), Bristol 2008, contributor
 Suspension (Bristol Old Vic) 2009

Television series
 Casualty (Season 7, 1992, episodes 5 & 13) BBC
Love Hurts (Season 2, episodes 5 & 7; Season 3 episodes 1, 2, 3, & 10) BBC
Band of Gold (Series 3, episodes 5 & 6) Granada TV
Byker Grove (Series 9) BBC
Love in the 21st Century (episodes 2, 3 & 5) Channel 4
Linda Green (episode 3) BBC

Television films
Rag Doll (HTV)
Just Like Eddie (HTV)
Where’s Willy? (HTV)
Sin Bin (BBC)
Forget You Ever Had Children (Picture Palace/ITV) in production
Dappers (pilot – in production) BBC

Feature films
Mamma Mia! (film series)
Mamma Mia! The Movie – screenplay
Mamma Mia! Here We Go Again – story

Awards
Her career accolades to date include the Bristol Old Vic/HTV Playwriting award (1987), and the Thames Television Writer-in-Residence and Best Play awards (1991) Mamma Mia! was also nominated for an Olivier Award for Best New Musical (2000) and for a Tony Award for Best Book of a Musical Book (2002). Catherine received The UK Film Council script award at The Women in Film and TV 2008 Awards and also jointly with Judy Craymer and Phyllida Lloyd, The ITV achievement of the year award. Mamma Mia! was named Best Musical at the UK National Film Awards in September 2008, and was nominated for the Golden Globe Award for Best Motion Picture - Musical or Comedy in December 2008. In January 2009, Mamma Mia! was nominated for the Outstanding British Film award at the BAFTA 62nd British Academy Film Awards.

See also

Mamma Mia!
Mamma Mia! (film)

References

External links
 
 Johnson speaks about Mamma Mia, BBC Points West, 9 July 2008
 Catherine Johnson at doollee.com
 

1957 births
British dramatists and playwrights
Culture in Bristol
Living people
People educated at Katharine Lady Berkeley's School
Writers from Bristol
Writers from Suffolk
People from Wickwar
WFTV Award winners